Musgrave Park may refer to:
 Musgrave Park, Belfast
 Musgrave Park, Brisbane, Queensland, Australia
 Musgrave Park, Cork, Ireland
 Musgrave Park, South Australia, former name of Amata, South Australia
 Musgrave Park Hospital, Belfast

See also
Musgrave (disambiguation)